Candy Cane Lane may refer to:

Places

Canada
Candy Cane Lane, Bredenbury, Saskatchewan
Candy Cane Lane (Edmonton), Alberta

United States
Candy Cane Lane, Duboistown, Pennsylvania
Candy Cane Lane, West Allis, Wisconsin
Candy Cane Lane, Ravenna, Seattle, Washington
Candy Cane Lane, West Frankfort, Illinois
Candy Cane Lane, Pacific Grove, California

Other uses
 Candy Cane Lane (film), upcoming film 
"Candy Cane Lane", a song by Sia on the 2017 album Everyday Is Christmas
"Candy Cane Lane", a song by Point of Grace on the 2010 album Home for the Holidays
Candy Cane Lanes, a minigame in the 2009 video game We Wish You a Merry Christmas

See also
Candy cane, a candy stick served at Christmas, from which the streets get their name